Coeur de Lion (French for Lionheart) is a title used to describe several medieval monarchs:

 Richard I of England
 Louis VIII of France
 Boleslaus I of Poland

Trains
 Coeur de Lion, a Great Western Railway 4-4-0 broad gauge steam locomotive
 Coeur de Lion, the British Railways Standard 'Britannia' class locomotive number 70007 (the first of the class to be withdrawn)
 Coeur de Lion, the British Rail Class 87 locomotive number 87012

Other uses
 Cœur de Lion, a French cheese brand by Bongrain
 Coeur de lion (film), a 2008 film

See also
 Coeur (disambiguation)
 Coeur d'Alene, a city in northern Idaho, United States